The 2018 Big Ten Football Championship Game presented by Discover was played on December 1, 2018 at Lucas Oil Stadium in Indianapolis, Indiana. The eighth annual Big Ten Football Championship Game, it determined the 2018 champion of the Big Ten Conference. Ohio State, the East Division champion, defeated West Division champion Northwestern 45–24 to win its second straight Big Ten Championship.

History
The 2018 Championship Game was the eighth in the Big Ten's 123-year history and the fifth to feature the conference's East and West alignment.

Teams

Northwestern Wildcats

After starting 1–3 with losses to Duke, Akron, and No. 14 Michigan, the Wildcats rebounded to win six of their next seven, including three wins over ranked teams (No. 20 Michigan State, No. 20 Wisconsin, and No. 21 Iowa); they clinched their first-ever Big Ten Championship berth with their win against Iowa. The Wildcats entered the Big Ten Championship Game with a record of 8–4, 8–1 in Big Ten play.

Ohio State Buckeyes

The Ohio State Buckeyes represented the Big Ten East Division in the game. Ohio State secured the spot with a 62–39 win over fourth-ranked Michigan. This was Ohio States second consecutive season representing the East.

Game summary

Scoring summary

Statistics

See also
List of Big Ten Conference football champions

References

Championship
Big Ten Football Championship Game
Northwestern Wildcats football games
Ohio State Buckeyes football games
December 2018 sports events in the United States
Big Ten Football Champ
2010s in Indianapolis